The Roc d'Enfer (2,244 m) is a mountain of the Chablais Alps, located west of Morzine in the French department of Haute-Savoie. It lies 20 km south of Lake Geneva.

References

External links

Roc d'Enfer on Hikr

Mountains of the Alps
Mountains of Haute-Savoie